Maryamin is a village in the southern Aleppo countryside, Aleppo Governorate, northwestern Syria.

Administratively, the village belongs to Nahiya al-Hader in Mount Simeon District. Nearby localities include al-Jumaymah  to the northeast, and Kafr Abid  to the east. In the 2004 census, Maryamin had a population of 1,045.

References

Villages in Aleppo Governorate
Populated places in Mount Simeon District